Estonian may refer to:
 Something of, from, or related to Estonia, a country in the Baltic region in northern Europe
 Estonians, people from Estonia, or of Estonian descent
 Estonian language
 Estonian cuisine
 Estonian culture

See also 
 
 Estonia (disambiguation)
 Languages of Estonia
 List of Estonians

Language and nationality disambiguation pages